The sixth electoral unit of Republika Srpska is a parliamentary constituency used to elect members to the National Assembly of Republika Srpska since 2014.  It consists of the Municipalities of Ugljevik,
Šamac,
Donji Žabar,
Pelagićevo,
Bijeljina and
Lopare as well as the Brčko District.

Demographics

Representatives

References

Constituencies of Bosnia and Herzegovina